is a passenger railway station  located in the city of Odawara, Kanagawa Prefecture, Japan, operated by the Izuhakone Railway.

Lines
Anabe Station is served by the  Daiyūzan Line, and is located 3.1 kilometers from the line’s terminus at Odawara Station.

Station layout
The station consists of a single side platform with a rain shelter built on the platform and a shed housing the machinery for automatic ticket machines. The station is unmanned.

Adjacent stations

History
Anabe Station was opened on October 15, 1925.

Passenger statistics
In fiscal 2019, the station was used by an average of 684 passengers daily (boarding passengers only).

The passenger figures (boarding passengers only) for previous years are as shown below.

Surrounding area
Prefectural Road 74 runs on the south side of the station, and the Karikawa River flows on the north side.

See also
List of railway stations in Japan

References

External links

Izuhakone Railway home page 

Railway stations in Kanagawa Prefecture
Railway stations in Japan opened in 1925
Izuhakone Daiyuzan Line
Railway stations in Odawara